Fatty Legs is a memoir aimed at middle-grade children, written by Christy Jordan-Fenton and Margaret Pokiak-Fenton and illustrated by Liz Amini-Holmes, published September 1, 2010 by Annick Press. The story introduces children to the devastating reality of the residential school system, a system focused on the assimilation of Indigenous peoples. The book was published two years before the work of the Truth and Reconciliation Commission began to investigate the residential school system and was among the first children's books from a survivor of Canada's Indian Residential School System.

A tenth anniversary edition was released in 2020 and included a new foreword by Dr. Debbie Reese and a new preface by Christy Jordan-Fenton.

Fatty Legs  was later followed by A Stranger at Home, as well as editions for younger readers entitled When I Was Eight and Not My Girl. The four books "have sold more than a quarter of a million copies and collected over 20 awards and distinctions."

Plot 
When Pokiak-Fenton was eight years old, a residential school opened nearby, and with the dream of learning to read, she begged her parents to go. However, upon arrival, she learned that the school was not as she imagined. Fatty Legs documents the vicious treatment she received at the school, particularly from one nun, having her hair cut, being locked in a dark basement, and the humiliation of being given red socks as a punishment. The story also speaks to the power of literature and of resiliency and fortitude.

Reception 
Fatty Legs received positive critical reception and was included on many recommended books lists as a way to introduce children to the history and trauma of the residential school system in an age-appropriate way.

Kirkus provided a starred review, calling the memoir "[a] moving and believable account" of Canadian residential schools. School Library Journal's Jody Kopple called it "[a]n excellent addition to any biography collection," noting, "the book is fascinating and unique, and yet universal in its message."

Fatty Legs formed part of a controversy in November 2020 when it came out that an assignment at W. A. Fraser Middle School in Abbotsford, British Columbia was using the book to show the positive side of residential school. Jordan-Fenton stated using the book out of context was “irresponsible at best, and intentionally or unintentionally, it is revisionism and the perpetuation of a falsehood.”

In 2010, Fatty Legs was named one of the best children's books of the year by The Globe and Mail. Ten years later, the Canadian Children's Book Centre included it on their list of the Best Books for Kids & Teens.

References 

2010 children's books
English-language books
Works about residential schools in Canada
2020 non-fiction books
Annick Press books
Canadian memoirs